Nightmare Family was a professional wrestling stable signed to All Elite Wrestling (AEW). The group's name derives from "The American Nightmare", the nickname of the faction's leader Cody Rhodes. He described the group as "an ensemble of focused individuals, some who train at the Nightmare Factory (AEW's training facility) together, who just have a singular focus over the sport".  In addition to Rhodes, his brother Dustin Rhodes is a member of the stable; both are the sons of the late Dusty Rhodes.

Background

Prior to the launch of AEW, Cody Rhodes and his brother Dustin Rhodes previously wrestled with the WWE. On June 21, 2018, Cody launched a YouTube channel titled Nightmare Family, showcasing behind-the-scenes videos of their professional wrestling events.

History

All Elite Wrestling
On January 1, 2019, Cody and Brandi Rhodes joined All Elite Wrestling, a new professional wrestling promotion founded by Shahid Khan and Tony Khan. Cody and Brandi signed contracts as on-screen talent and also as Executive Vice President and Chief Brand Officer respectively. On April 20, Cody's opponent for AEW's inaugural event Double or Nothing was revealed as his brother Dustin Rhodes. Cody defeated Dustin at Double or Nothing, and the match received a 5 star rating from Dave Meltzer of Wrestling Observer Newsletter. After the match, Cody made a plea to Dustin to reunite as a tag team to face The Young Bucks at Fight for the Fallen. Dustin accepted, reuniting The Rhodes Brothers for the first time in over four years.

On December 30, 2019, Arn Anderson signed a contract with AEW as Cody's personal advisor and head coach. 
On January 15, 2020 at Bash at the Beach, Diamond Dallas Page teamed with Q. T. Marshall and Dustin Rhodes for his first match since 2016.

On October 30, 2020, Gunn Club (Austin, and Billy) and Lee Johnson joined the group. On February 8, 2021, Aaron Solow and Nick Comoroto joined the group.

On the March 31, 2021 edition of AEW Dynamite, Cody Rhodes and Q. T. Marshall fought in an unsanctioned Exhibition match with Arn Anderson serving as the referee. After about 7 minutes of in-ring action, a frustrated QT attacked Anderson and left the ring, allowing Aaron Solow and Nick Comoroto, as well as Nightmare Factory trainee Anthony Ogogo, to attack Cody from behind. QT continued to lead the group in a brutal beatdown of Cody and the rest of the Nightmare Family, ending his (as well as Solow and Comoroto's) relationship with the group.

After months of inactivity, Cody Rhodes departed from AEW on February 15, 2022 leaving the stable's future unclear.

Members

Former

Part-time

Timeline

Sub-groups

Other media

Cody Rhodes, Q. T. Marshall, and Glacier are co-owners and coaches of The Nightmare Factory training facility. It was previously known as One Fall Power Factory.

Championships and accomplishments
All Elite Wrestling
AEW TNT Championship (3 times) – Cody 
Dynamite Award (1 time)
Best Moment on the Mic (2021) – 
CBS Sports
Promo of the Year (2019) – 
Pro Wrestling Illustrated
Match of the Year (2019) – 
Ranked Cody No. 7 of the top 500 singles wrestlers in the PWI 500 in 2020
Ranked Dustin No. 137 of the top 500 singles wrestlers in the PWI 500 in 2020
Ranked Marshall No. 468 of the top 500 singles wrestlers in the PWI 500 in 2020
Ranked Brandi No. 50 of the top 100 female wrestlers in the PWI Female 100 in 2019

Notes

References

External links

All Elite Wrestling teams and stables
Professional wrestling schools